Yoel Dov-Ber Perski (1816 – 17 November 1871), also known as Yoel Ber Kohen, was a Hebrew writer and translator.

His publications include Kevod Melakhim (Königsberg and Vilna, 1851–53), a translation of François Fénelon's Les aventures de Télémaque, fils d'Ulysse, and Ḥayyei Asaf (Warsaw, 1858), a translation of Aesop's Fables, along with a biography of their author. He also wrote Sefer Neveh Tehilah (1846), a Passover Haggadah with commentary; Heikhal Ra'anan and Shemen Ra'anan (Vilna, 1863), commentaries on the Yalkut Shimoni; and Battei Kehunnah, a commentary on Bereshit Rabba and Shemot Rabba.

Partial bibliography

References
 

1816 births
1871 deaths
19th-century Jewish biblical scholars
French–Hebrew translators
People from Valozhyn
Translators from the Russian Empire
Jewish writers from the Russian Empire